Landéda is a commune in the Finistère department of Brittany in north-western France.

Geography
The coastal commune of Landéda forms a peninsula between two rias, the Aber Wrac'h to the north and the Aber-Benoît to the south.

History
 1790: commune established
 1822: linked with the commune of Brouennou
 1829: annexed the commune of Brouennou

Population
Inhabitants of Landéda are called in French Landédaens.

Sea rescue
Landeda is the base for the high-speed rescue motorboat located at the port of Aber Wrac'h.  The rescue service is operated by volunteers.  The rescue motorboat is named the President Joseph Oulhen, which is the name of a former manager of the service who died in service in 1986.

Economy
The port of the Aber Wrac'h is within the territory of the commune. It includes a marina managed by the Chamber of Commerce and Industry of Brest.

Sights
 Sainte-Marguerite chapel
 Troménec chapel
 Brouennou chapel

Other notable sights include an abbey, a manor, many stone crosses and islands with ancient ruins.

Associations
 Oak Theatre Company
 Vrac'h Amateur Theatre

See also
Communes of the Finistère department

References

External links

 Landeda, Official website for the Commune  of Landéda L'Aberwrac'h.

Communes of Finistère
Osismii
Populated coastal places in France